Battledogs is a 2013 American television film featuring Dennis Haysbert, Ernie Hudson and Bill Duke.

Plot
When a strange werewolf virus threatens to decimate first New York and then the world, a rogue general uses the disease to create an army of supersoldiers.

Cast
 Craig Sheffer as Major Brian Hoffman
 Dennis Haysbert as Lieutenant General Christopher Monning
 Ernie Hudson as Max Stevens
 Bill Duke as President Donald Sheridan
 Kate Vernon as Dr. Ellen Gordon
 Ariana Richards as Donna Voorhees
 Wes Studi as Captain Falcons

References

External links
 
 

2013 television films
2013 films
Syfy original films
The Asylum films
American werewolf films
Films set in New York (state)
Films shot in Buffalo, New York
2010s English-language films
2010s American films